Moto E is an Android smartphone developed and manufactured by Motorola Mobility. It was unveiled and released online in India and the United States on May 13, 2014.

Released in the wake of the success of the Moto G, the Moto E was designed to be a durable, low-end device marketed towards first-time smartphone owners and budget-minded consumers, especially within emerging markets.

The Moto E was positively received by U.S. technology publications, who praised the device's relatively high quality in comparison to other low-end smartphones common in emerging markets, albeit with shortcomings such as a lack of front-facing camera or camera flash. In India, the release of the Moto E was met with similarly high demand to that of the Indian release of the Moto G, and crashed the website of Flipkart—the online retailer exclusively marketing the device in the country.

The Moto E was succeeded by a second-generation model in February 2015.

Development 
The Moto E was designed to specifically compete against feature phones in emerging markets; according to Charlie Tritschler, Motorola's senior vice-president of products, the Moto E's goal was to "end the feature phone", and the device was primarily targeted towards "people who have been on the edge for a while but just didn’t think they could afford a smartphone." The Moto E carries on from the entry-level Moto G, which it released in late 2013; the Moto G was a major success for the company—who had been acquired by Google Inc. in 2012, and was in the process of being sold to Lenovo as of January 2014. In the first quarter of 2014, Motorola sold 6.5 million phones—a number led by strong sales of the Moto G, especially in markets such as the United Kingdom—where the company accounted for 6% of smartphone sales sold in the quarter, up from nearly 0.

Sales of the Moto G was also notably large in the emerging market of India; Magnus Ahlqvist, vice president of Motorola's EMEA division, estimated that between 65 and 70% of users in India still used feature phones. In February 2014, Motorola had partnered with the online retailer Flipkart to be the exclusive retailer of the Moto G in India, marking its first release in the country since 2012. The website's original stock of 20,000 units sold out within hours, and it sold 247,000 Moto G units in just two months, ranking as the 12th highest-selling smartphone in the country for the first quarter of 2014.

Trischler noted that durability was a key selling point in emerging markets, specifically citing the device's use of Gorilla Glass 3, an anti-smudge screen coating, and a similar splashproof coating to the Moto G—which he also noted were attributes that are not normally seen in such low-end products. The company also emphasized its efforts to reduce the cost of constructing the phone—expanding upon those used by the Moto G. Tritschler stated that these measures must be designed "...[right] into the product; you can’t just cut the price." Overall, the Moto E was 40% cheaper than the Moto G. The version of Android shipped on the device, 4.4.2 "KitKat", contains a number of changes designed to optimize the operating system for low-end devices such as the Moto G and E. To emphasize the device's performance, Motorola argued in a demonstration that the Moto E was slightly faster than the high-end Samsung Galaxy S4 at performing basic tasks such as launching certain apps (such as the camera and web browser) and going back to the home screen from an app.

Release 
The Moto E was unveiled on May 13, 2014. India was one of the first countries where the Moto E was released; the device was released exclusively by Flipkart, where it retailed for  without a contract. Upon its launch at midnight local time, demand for the device was so high that the resulting surge in orders caused the website to crash. The device was also released online through Motorola's website in the United States and in the United Kingdom. The Moto E was to be released in other markets, such as Brazil, Canada, Mexico, and Spain.

Specifications 
The Moto E's build and design is similar to that of the Moto G, with a "splashproof" coating, curved backing, and a front-mounted speaker below the screen. The device is available in either black or white front colors, and has an interchangeable rear cover with different color options. It features a  IPS qHD display, coated with Gorilla Glass 3. The device uses a dual-core 1.2 GHz Qualcomm Snapdragon 200 processor, and includes 1 GB of RAM. The Moto E has 4 GB of internal storage, which can be expanded up to 32 GB with a MicroSDHC card. The Moto E only supports up to 3G connectivity, and was available in a dual SIM model in selected markets. The device includes a non-removable 1980 mAh battery, which Motorola touted as having "all-day" battery life. The Moto E features a 5-megapixel rear-facing fixed-focus camera; the device does not include a flash or a front-facing camera.

The Moto E shipped with Android 4.4 "KitKat". Several Motorola-specific apps are included, including Assist, as introduced by the Moto X, which automatically enable or disable certain modes, such as silencing the ringer or auto replying to text messages, depending on certain scenarios—such as when a user is in a meeting as determined by their calendar, or driving. The Moto E also includes a new "Alert" app, which allows users to notify others of their location. Motorola committed to upgrading the Moto E to the next major version of Android following its release: an update to Android 5.0 "Lollipop" was released in February 2015.

Reception 
Vlad Savov of The Verge praised the design of the Moto E for not appearing "downmarket" and for having adequate performance, but still noting that the device's camera was not as good as those on other smartphones. He went on to say that "a market populated by the likes of the Galaxy Fame and Galaxy Young—both of which are stuck on Android 4.1 with little hope of an upgrade—hadn't seen anything like the quick and well-made G before. Or since, for that matter." Chris Velazco of Engadget was relatively positive, noting that the Moto E was well-designed and carried the trademark design cues of Motorola's recent products, while praising its vivid display, along with its sufficient performance, battery life, and nearly stock Android software. In conclusion, it was felt that "for all its minor shortcomings, the Moto E still represents a level of power and quality that's become even more accessible to people the world over, and that's something worth celebrating. If all you need is a smartphone that can take you to Facebook, capture fodder for Instagram or fire off missives on Twitter (or WhatsApp or Weibo), the Moto E will make a worthy sidekick. Not every important device has to be a flashy flagship." However, the device was still panned for its small amount of internal storage, and for lacking a camera flash or front-facing camera.

References

External links 
 

Android (operating system) devices
Motorola smartphones
Mobile phones introduced in 2014
Discontinued smartphones
Motorola products